Motosacoche was founded in 1899, by Henri and Armand Dufaux, in Geneva, Switzerland. Motosacoche was once the biggest Swiss motorcycle manufacturer, known also for its MAG (Motosacoche Acacias Genève) engines, used by other European motorcycle manufacturers.

History

From 1900 Motosacoche produced a bicycle auxiliary engine in a subframe that could be installed into a conventional bicycle. The details of the engine were hidden behind covers, and to some this looked like an engine in a bag, hence the Motosacoche name, meaning "engine in a bag".

In 1910 Royal Enfield used Motosacoche 344 cc 2.75 hp engines in a successful V-twin model. They are reputed to have supplied Triumph, Ariel, Matchless and Brough-Superior with engines at times too, first through H & A Dufaux England Ltd, and then, by 1912, Motosacoche Ltd (GB), with Osborne Louis De Lissa. Motosacoche had factories in Switzerland, France and Italy, and supplied MAG engines to continental manufacturers including Clement, Condor, Imperia, Neander and Monet Goyon.

When the Bol d'Or 24-hour event was first held on the outskirts of Paris in 1922 the winning rider covered more than 750 miles (1206 kilometres) on a 500 cc Motosacoche.

In 1928 they made a name in the Grand Prix, with the Motosacoche 350 M 35 ohc racing bike, built by Dougal Marchant of England, ridden to two European championship titles, 350 and 500, by Wal Handley.

Bert le Vack joined Motosacoche in 1930. He had ridden in the 1914 Isle of Man Tourist Trophy and became the works rider, chief designer and tuner. Le Vack was killed in an accident in the Swiss Alps on 17 September 1931, while testing the Motosacoche A 50 near Bern. He was to present the motorbike to a Swiss Army officer.

During the 1930s Motosacoche were eclipsed by the Norton Motorcycle Company and went into decline. After World War II, an unusual Marchant-designed 200 cc sv was shown in 1947, but not produced. In 1953 Richard Kuchen-designed German UT motorcycles were marketed under the Motosacoche name, but this was unsuccessful, and by 1956 motorcycles were no longer produced, but MAG stationary and industrial motors continued.

The Motosacoche Brand is now held by MAJ Holding SARL in Geneva. The company Motosacoche S.A. started in 2020.  
An e-bike prototype is being produced, to be made public at the beginning of 2021. The official Motosacoche book, in French, described as "Motosacoche: the story of the legendary Swiss motorcycle" was available in 2021.

Models
Type-A, 1901 - 1910,
D4, Motosacoche for women 1908,
2C10, 1911,
Autosacoche, 1913
1C9H Sport, 1928–39, 498 cc, o.h.v.,20 hp
2 Cylinders, 1930 & 1932
209, 1928
210, 1928 & 1929
212 twin, 1954, 247 cc, o.h.c
2C7, 1914, 496 cc, s.v.
304 Tourer, 1927, 346 cc, i.o.e.
309, 1928
310, 1928 & 1929
310 BL, 1933
318, 1933
319, 1933
322 Competition, 1933
350 Competition, 1930 & 1932
350 Sport, 1930 & 1932
350 Tourer, 1930 & 1932
409, 1928 & 1929
409 BL, 1933
410, 1928 & 1929
410 LL, 1933
419, 1933
420, 1933
422 Competition, 1933
425 Luxe, 1933
426 Luxe, 1933
439 Tourisme Luxe, 1939, 498 cc, s.v.
500 Competition, 1930 & 1932
500 Sport, 1930 & 1932
500 Touring, 1930 & 1932
720, 1933
720 Tourisme Grand Luxe, 1939, 846 cc, s.v.
A1, 1908, 214 cc, a.i.o.e
A50 (works racer), 1928, o.h.c.
BL, 1929 & 1930
Jubilee Sport, 1931, 498 cc, o.h.v.
L, 1928
R10H, 1929
R14H, 1929 & 1930
R14K, 1929
R9K, 1930
877TL, 1931 & 1932

Sources

External links
 
 Albisteam Motosacoche History
 Globalnet Motosacoche UK
 VIATHEMA Motosacoche History
 Motosacoche Official Website

Manufacturing companies based in Geneva
Motosacoche